The Noveschi or the IX were a mercantile-banking oligarchy that ruled the Italian city-state of Siena from 1287 to 1355 AD  They oversaw the period of Siena's greatest stability and prosperity in the Medieval era.  A significant contributor to the instability that felled their regime was the 1348 outbreak of the Black Death.

References

Medieval bankers
13th-century rulers in Europe
14th-century rulers in Europe
13th century in the Republic of Siena
14th century in the Republic of Siena
14th-century Italian businesspeople